The Shastri Indo-Canadian Institute is a binational non-profit organization with registered charity status in Canada. The institute supports the creation of binational links between academia, government, the business community and civil society organizations by funding research and hosting seminars. It provides grants as well as internships and fellowships to provide opportunities for individuals to gain first-hand experience in India or Canada in their field of expertise. Furthermore, the Institute serves as a liaison between educational institutions and the Indian diaspora in Canada. Dr. B. Hariharan, Professor and Head, Institute of English, for the University of Kerala, is the president of the organization.

History 
Named after former Prime Minister of India, Lal Bahadur Shastri, the Shastri Indo-Canadian Institute was created in 1968 through a joint announcement of the governments of Canada and  India. The idea of forming an institute to promote scholarly activity between Canada and India was first conceived by Dr. Michael Brecher, a political science professor at McGill University, when he met Prime Minister Shastri who gave the convocation address at McGill University in June 1965. In his address, the Prime Minister suggested that there needed to be institutional understanding to promote scholarly exchange in the field of humanities and social sciences.

The initial purpose of the institute was to encourage Canadian educational institutions to focus university level teaching and research on India. With an emphasis on the humanities and social sciences, the Shastri Institute's programmes funded fellowships and distributed Indian books and journals to the libraries of the four founding Canadian member institutions.

Operations

Funding 
The institute's main sources of funding come from the Canadian and India governments, chiefly through the Canadian International Development Agency (CIDA) and the Department of Foreign Affairs and International Trade (DFAIT) on the Canadian side and from the Ministry of Human Resource Development (India) from the Government of India.  It also receives contributions from Canadian member institutions as well as private donations.

Governance 
An eight-member bi-national Executive Council, which is elected by representatives of the member institutions, governs the Shastri Institute. The presidency of the Executive Council alternates annually between Canada and India. The institute also operates with the guidance of the Indian Administrative Committee, as well as with advice from the Canadian Advisory Council and the Indian Advisory Council. 
In addition to the Executive Council, there are various committees within the Shastri Institute, which are filled by representatives of the member institutions. Staff members at the India and Canada offices, located in New Delhi and Calgary respectively, carry out all administrative responsibilities of the institution.

Grants and awards

For Indian/Canadian Students 
Showcasing and Disseminating Knowledge and Research (SDKR)
Internship programme for undergraduates or integrated Course
Mitacs-SICI Partnership: Globalink Research Award Programme
Shastri Publication Grant (SPG)
Shastri Research Student Fellowship(SRSF)
Shastri Scholar Travel Subsidy Grant(SSTSG)
Shastri Student Internship Project(SSIP)

For Indian Students 
Lal Bahadur Shastri Student Prize (Value- CAD 500): Two Prizes are given out to Canadian citizens or permanent residents who are enrolled in an undergraduate or graduate degree programme at a Canadian university that is a member of the Shastri Indo-Canadian Institute. The Prize is given out to students who submit an essay on any topic with specific relevance to India which was written as a class assignment and has been graded.
Student Excellence Awards (Value- CAD 2000): Five Awards are given out to Canadian citizens or permanent residents who are enrolled in an undergraduate or graduate degree programme at a Canadian university that is a member of the Shastri Indo-Canadian Institute who are registered in the last two years of undergraduate study in a programme with a substantial India component. The awards are given to students with high academic achievements who can clearly demonstrate how the award will contribute to their knowledge of India and how this knowledge will contribute to their long-term career goals.
India Studies Fellowship: The purpose of the India Studies Programme is to promote understanding of India in Canada. The Fellowship covers a round trip airfare from the fellow's residence to the place of affiliation in India and a monthly allowance up to Rs 24,000 per month and is open to Master's and PhD students as well as students who want to get language training or visual and performing artists who want to expand their experience in an Indian art form.

For Indian students 
Canadian Studies Doctoral Research Fellowship: This fellowship is designed to assist full-time graduate students at degree-granting institutions of higher education, whose dissertations are related in substantial part to Canada, to undertake doctoral research about Canada. The maximum value of any award will consist of a contribution towards international airfare, an allowance of CAD 1,200 per complete month towards expenses while in Canada, up to a maximum of 6 months.

For Canadian and Indian faculty 

Shastri Conference & Lecture Series Grant (SCLSG)
Shastri Mapping & Matching Interest Workshop (SMMIW)
Showcasing and Disseminating Knowledge and Research (SDKR)
SICI Membership Development Fund (SMDF) 
Golden Jubilee Conference and Lecture Series Grant (GJCLSG) 
Shastri Mobility Programme (SMP)
Shastri Programme Development Grant (SPDG)
Shastri Membership Development Grant (SMDG)
Shastri Publication Grant (SPG)
Shastri Institutional Collaborative Research Grant (SICRG)
Shastri Faculty Development Programme For Vocational Education (SFDPVE)
Shastri Covid-19 Pandemic Response Grant (SCPRG): Call for Innovative Solutions 
Shastri Research Grant (SRG): Special Competition
Scheme for Promotion of Academic and Research Collaboration (SPARC) 
Shastri Global Initiative for Academic Network (GIAN)
Shastri Scholar Travel Subsidy Grant (SSTSG) 
Shastri Faculty Training and Internationalization Program (FTI)

Millennium Development Goals Research Grant (Value- CAD 80,000): One grant is awarded for a period of 30 months to fund bi-national research teams to undertake public policy relevant research toward one or more of the eight United Nations Millennium Development Goals.
Partnership Development Seed Grant (Value- CAD 15,000): Five grants are awarded for a period of one year to projects that serve as a catalyst for activities which contribute to formal institutional agreements or other long-term partnerships between Canadian and Indian institutions. Funds may also be used to support bi-national seminars, conferences, meetings, or other activities that build awareness of potential collaboration opportunities between Canadian and Indian institutions and promote sharing of knowledge, information, resources and expertise.
Scholarship Travel Subsidy Grant (Value- 50% of travel expenses up to $1200): The subsidy grant is in place to assist scholars to participate in conferences and academic meetings affiliated with Shastri member institutes.

For Canadian faculty only 
 India Studies Award: The purpose of the India Studies Programme is to promote Canadian faculty research and training in an area of expertise in India. The Fellowship covers a round trip airfare from the fellow's residence to the place of affiliation in India and a monthly allowance up to Rs 24,000 per month.

For Indian faculty only 
Canadian Studies Programme Development Grant: Started in 1979, grants are provided to encourage scholarly inquiry and professional academic activities with the objective of contributing to the development and expansion of Canadian Studies at Indian Universities. The value of the grant varies since the amount provided is meant to defray direct costs related to professional activities initiated by the institution, such as domestic Indian travel of visiting Canadian scholars abroad as well as cost of materials, printing, office-related charges and computer time.
Canadian Studies Faculty Enrichment Fellowship: This program of support is designed to increase knowledge and understanding of Canada abroad by assisting academics in higher education institutions to develop and teach courses about Canada in their own discipline, as part of their regular teaching load. The program enables academic award holders to come to Canada and gather the necessary information and material to devise a new course on Canada, or to modify or extend significantly the Canadian component of an existing course.
Canadian Studies Faculty Research Fellowship: This fellowship is designed to assist individual academics in higher education institutions to undertake short-term research about Canada or on an aspect of Canada's bilateral relations with the participating countries. The purpose is to increase knowledge and understanding of Canada through publication of pertinent articles in the foreign or international scholarly press.

For libraries 
Canadian Studies in India: The programme was initially launched in 1976 as a journal program. The programmer took a huge leap forward in 1991, when the Canadian Studies Library (CSL) was inaugurated as the main information resource centre of Canadian publications in India. The library houses a large and comprehensive collection of books, journals and newspapers as well as a variety of other media, with specific Canadian content. While the language of the collection is primarily in English, there is also a significant amount of material in French, both in literature and other subjects.
Library program in Canada: The Programme acquires current Indian publications for scholarly and public use, housed in the libraries of the member institutions. The libraries of SICI's three founding members (the University of Toronto, McGill University, and the University of British Columbia) act as resource libraries while the other member institutions act as support libraries, acquiring material on a more limited scale to support their individual India Studies programmes.

Member Institutions 
The four founding members of the Shastri Institution were McGill University, the University of British Columbia, the University of Toronto and the National Library of Canada.  In 1980, the University of Ottawa became the first bilingual organization to join the Shastri Institute while HEC Montreal and Université Laval became the first francophone members in 2006.

List of Canadian members 

University of Alberta
University of Calgary
University of British Columbia
Carleton University
Concordia University
Dalhousie University
École de technologie supérieurel
University of Guelph
HEC Montréal
Université Laval
University of Lethbridge
University of Manitoba
McGill University
McMaster University
Université de Montréal
Mount Allison University
University of Ottawa
Queen's University
University of Regina
Saint Mary's University
Toronto Metropolitan University
University of Saskatchewan
University of Toronto
University of Victoria
University of Waterloo
University of Western Ontario
Wilfrid Laurier University
York University

List of Indian members

University of Agricultural Science, Dharwad
Assam University
Banaras Hindu University
Berhampur University
University of Calcutta
Central Institute of English and Foreign Languages
University of Delhi
Dr. Harisingh Gour University
Goa University
Hidayatullah National Law University
Himachal Pradesh University
University of Hyderabad
Indian Council of Philosophical Research
Indian Institute for Social and Economic Change
Indian Institute of Advanced Study, Shimla
Indian Institute of Management Ahmedabad
Indian Institute of Management Bangalore
Indian Institute of Management Calcutta
Indian Institute of Management Indore
Indian Institute of Management Kozhikode
Indian Institute of Management Lucknow
Indian Institute of Technology Bombay
Indian Institute of Technology Kanpur
Indian Institute of Technology Kharagpur
Indian Institute of Technology Madras
Indian Institute of Technology Roorkee
Indian Institute of Technology Guwahati
Indira Gandhi National Open University
Jadavpur University
University of Jammu
Jawaharlal Nehru University
University of Kerala
University of Madras
Madurai Kamaraj University
Maharaja Sayajirao University of Baroda
Mangalore University
University of Mumbai
University of Mysore
National Academy of Legal Studies and Research University
National Institute of Science, Technology and Development Studies
National Institute of Technology, Tiruchirappalli
National Institute of Technology, Jaipur
National Law University, Jodhpur
National Law School of Delhi
National Museum Institute
Osmania University
Panjab University
Pondicherry University
Dr. Ram Manohar Lohia National Law University (RMLNLU)
SNDT Women's University
Sri Venkataswara University
Indian Institute of Technology Jammu

Notes 

Canada–India relations
Charities based in Canada